Waldmühlen is an Ortsgemeinde – a community belonging to a Verbandsgemeinde – in the Westerwaldkreis in Rhineland-Palatinate, Germany.

Geography

The community lies in the Westerwald between Siegen und Limburg. Waldmühlen belongs to the Verbandsgemeinde of Rennerod, a kind of collective municipality. Its seat is in the like-named town. The Holzbach crosses Bundesstraße 54 at the community's edge.

History
In the 15th century, Waldmühlen had its first documentary mention as Walkmohle.

Politics

The municipal council is made up of 8 council members who were elected in a majority vote in a municipal election on 26 March 2006.

Economy and infrastructure

Running right through the community is Bundesstraße 54, linking Limburg an der Lahn with Siegen. The nearest Autobahn interchanges are Herborn and Haiger-Burbach on the A 45 (Dortmund–Gießen), and also Montabaur and Limburg-Nord on the A 3 (Cologne–Frankfurt), all between 20 and 25 km away. The nearest InterCityExpress stops are the railway stations at Montabaur and Limburg-Süd on the Cologne-Frankfurt high-speed rail line.

References

Municipalities in Rhineland-Palatinate
Westerwaldkreis